Mystery Island is a live-action sci-fi adventure serial produced by Hanna-Barbera Productions that originally aired as a segment on The Skatebirds from September 10, 1977, to January 21, 1978, on CBS.

In the fall of 1979, Mystery Island continued to air on The Skatebirds when the show returned to CBS in a shortened half-hour version on Sunday mornings until January 25, 1981. In September 2005, episodes resurfaced on Boomerang and were rebroadcast as part of Captain Caveman and the Teen Angels.

Summary
The series follows the adventures of three young people: Chuck Kelly (Stephen Parr), a pilot; Sue Corwin (Lynn Marie Johnston), a computer expert; her younger brother Sandy (Larry Volk) and their computer robot called P.O.P.S. (voiced by Frank Welker). The trio become stranded on a remote island after the evil mad scientist Dr. Strange (Michael Kermoyan) uses his projector beam ray to crash their plane. Dr. Strange hopes to capture P.O.P.S. and use it in his quest for world domination.

Mystery Island was very similar in scope to Sid and Marty Krofft's 1976 live-action series Dr. Shrinker (from The Krofft Supershow) which also saw a trio of humans on a plane brought down to the island of a different mad scientist. A total of sixteen episodes of Mystery Island were produced, each running ten minutes and included a cliffhanger that was resolved in the next installment.

Characters

Main characters
 Chuck Kelly (portrayed by Stephen Parr) - A dedicated young pilot stranded on Mystery Island with Sue and Sandy Corwin and their robot P.O.P.S. He is determined to get the group safely back to civilization, and though sometimes prone to rash decisions, often sticks his neck out for the others.
 Sue Corwin (portrayed by Lynn Marie Johnston) - A pretty and feisty young computer expert whose scientist father created the robot P.O.P.S. Though she is skeptical about P.O.P.S.' claims of having feelings, she does care for the robot's well-being, as well as for her brother and Chuck.
 Sandy Corwin (portrayed by Larry Volk) - Her likeable adolescent brother. Though he frequently argues with his sister, the two care for each other. He looks up to Chuck, and has a good rapport with P.O.P.S., often defending the robot's claims to feeling emotions. He is also an accomplished high school gymnast.
 P.O.P.S. (voiced by Frank Welker) - The robot whose vast intelligence and ability to speak many languages has made him the target of Dr. Strange. He is similar to C-3PO in that both function as comic relief, and have a prim and fussy British butler type of personality, and a tendency to fret whenever a dangerous situation arises. He claims to be capable of feelings. The P.O.P.S. prop costume was a re-use of the original Robot B-9 from the 1960s television series Lost in Space, modified with a bubble on its shoulders, a cylindrical (rather than bubble) head, a blue-and-white paint job, and other minor changes (P.O.P.S. image.). It has since been restored to its original Robot B-9 appearance.

Villains
 Dr. Strange (portrayed by Michael Kermoyan) - The principal villain of the series. He is a mad scientist obsessed with obtaining P.O.P.S. and using his vast knowledge to give him world domination. Doctor Strange's full real name, if he even had one, was never revealed throughout the series' run. He should not be confused with the Marvel Comics superhero of the same name.
 Krieg (portrayed by Henry Corden) - Dr. Strange's nasty but inept chief henchman. He wants very much to impress his boss but usually falls short.
 Sly (actor unknown) - A bald-headed oaf who is unofficially Krieg's second-in-command and somewhat smarter, usually the first to question his superior's dubious decisions.
 Crunch (actor unknown) - Another of Dr. Strange's thuggish henchmen, and their unofficial clown. He's usually the first to be "volunteered" whenever Dr. Strange needs a human "guinea-pig" to test a new weapon on.
 The Parrot - Dr. Strange's pet which appears occasionally. It seems to be the one thing Dr. Strange shows any affection for, similar to Ernst Stavro Blofeld with his cat.

There are at least two other henchmen, but they are never named and never speak, and are played by two sets of actors who switch from episode to episode.

Other characters
 The Mud People - The mud-covered island natives who pursue P.O.P.S., believing the robot to be a god. They speak in some kind of primitive language that only P.O.P.S. and Titan can understand and translate.
 The Bird Men - A race of humanoid birds from the planet Falconia who were transported to Mystery Island by Dr. Strange prior to the beginning of the series.
 Wark (actor unknown) - A Bird Man who can speak in English. He is determined to turn Sue Corwin into a bird-woman to serve his people as their new princess and oracle.
 The Lava Man (actor unknown) - A huge, hulking creature made of lava who befriends the Corwins and Chuck after they save his life. He communicates mainly in grunting and a kind of gibberish which only P.O.P.S. can translate. The Lava Man has a bit of a crush on Sue.
 The Ape Men - A race of super-intelligent apes that are the result of an experiment in evolution by Dr. Strange to whom they are very loyal as they wish him to advance them into human beings. The Ape Men are shown to be afraid of the Mud People.
 Korba - The leader of the Ape Men.
 Titan (voice actor unknown) - A massive computer with artificial intelligence who considers all humans inferior, except possibly its creator Dr. Strange.

Episodes

References

External links
 
 Mystery Island at 70s Live Kid Vid
 Mystery Island at Saturday Morning Cult-TV Blogging

1977 American television series debuts
1977 American television series endings
1970s American children's television series
American children's adventure television series
American children's mystery television series
American children's science fiction television series
CBS original programming
Television shows set on islands
Television series about robots
Television series by Hanna-Barbera
Television series by Warner Bros. Television Studios
English-language television shows